Gérard Séty (13 December 1922 – 1 February 1998) was  a French actor.

Partial filmography

The Temptation of Barbizon (1946) - Le chauffeur (uncredited)
Night Warning (1946) - Un pilote américain (uncredited)
Patrie (1946)
Les aventures des Pieds-Nickelés (1948)
Mission in Tangier (1949) - Un client du cabaret
Menace de mort (1950) - Jean
Le trésor des Pieds-Nickelés (1950) - Le capitaine
Nuits de Paris (1951)
The Porter from Maxim's (1953) - Le chambellan
Act of Love (1953) - (uncredited)
The Red and the Black (1954) - Le lieutenant Liéven
Pas de souris dans le business (1955) - Maurice Trupeau
Lady Chatterley's Lover (1955) - Michaelis
Meeting in Paris (1956) - Le sculpteur
Miss Catastrophe (1957) - Mathias - l'escroc
Les Espions (1957) - Le docteur Malic
Maigret Sets a Trap (1958) - Georges "Jojo" Vacher
Montparnasse 19 (1958) - Léopold Zborowsky
Le travail c'est la liberté (1959) - Eugène Boullu
Les Pique-assiette (1960) - Santiago
My Son, the Hero (1962) - Aquiles
Seul... à corps perdu (1963) - Marc Forestier
Cadavres en vacances (1963) - Bernard
A Taste for Women (1964) - Léon Palmer
The War Is Over (1966) - Bill
 (1969) - Legoix
Il faut vivre dangereusement (1975) - Courtade
L'argent des autres (1978) - De Nully
Les filles du régiment (1978) - Bobby, le général
The Dogs (1979) - Le maire
La puce et le privé (1981) - Rossi
Van Gogh (1991) - Gachet
Les Visiteurs (1993) - Edgar Bernay
Fanfan (1993) - Ti
Délit mineur (1994) - Claude's Father

References

External links

 

1922 births
1998 deaths
Male actors from Paris
French male film actors
French male stage actors
French male television actors
20th-century French male actors